The South Walker Creek Coal Mine is a coal mine in Strathfield, Isaac Region, Central Queensland region of Australia. The mine has coal reserves amounting to 298 million tonnes of coking coal, one of the largest coal reserves in Asia and the world. As at 2012, the mine had an annual production capacity of 3.6 million tonnes of coal.

South Walker Creek mine is located 40 km west of Nebo within the Bowen Basin. Exports travel to port via the Goonyella railway line.  The mine is owned by Stanmore Resources Pty Ltd.

South Walker Creek mine is the site of a significant megafauna fossils.  20 ancient species have been discovered at the mine.

See also

Coal in Australia
List of mines in Australia

References 

Coal mines in Queensland
Mines in Central Queensland
1995 establishments in Australia
Surface mines in Australia